Rubén Arado (born 11 October 1970) is a Cuban table tennis player. He competed at the 1992 Summer Olympics and the 2000 Summer Olympics.

References

1970 births
Living people
Cuban male table tennis players
Olympic table tennis players of Cuba
Table tennis players at the 1992 Summer Olympics
Table tennis players at the 2000 Summer Olympics
Pan American Games medalists in table tennis
Pan American Games bronze medalists for Cuba
Medalists at the 1991 Pan American Games
Table tennis players at the 1991 Pan American Games
20th-century Cuban people